Brzeźnica may refer to the following places in Poland:
Brzeźnica, Lower Silesian Voivodeship (south-west Poland)
Brzeźnica, Podlaskie Voivodeship (north-east Poland)
Brzeźnica, Łódź Voivodeship (central Poland)
Brzeźnica, Bochnia County in Lesser Poland Voivodeship (south Poland)
Brzeźnica, Wadowice County in Lesser Poland Voivodeship (south Poland)
Brzeźnica, Subcarpathian Voivodeship (south-east Poland)
Brzeźnica, Świętokrzyskie Voivodeship (south-central Poland)
Brzeźnica, Tarnów County in Lesser Poland Voivodeship (south Poland)
Brzeźnica, Masovian Voivodeship (east-central Poland)
Brzeźnica, Greater Poland Voivodeship (west-central Poland)
Brzeźnica, Silesian Voivodeship (south Poland)
Brzeźnica, Krosno Odrzańskie County in Lubusz Voivodeship (west Poland)
Brzeźnica, Żagań County in Lubusz Voivodeship (west Poland)
Brzeźnica, Opole Voivodeship (south-west Poland)
Brzeźnica, Gmina Kętrzyn in Warmian-Masurian Voivodeship (north Poland)
Brzeźnica, Gmina Srokowo in Warmian-Masurian Voivodeship (north Poland)
Brzeźnica, Szczecinek County in West Pomeranian Voivodeship (north-west Poland)
Nowa Brzeźnica in Łódź Voivodeship (central Poland)